93rd NBR Awards
Best Film:
Licorice Pizza

The 93rd National Board of Review Awards, honoring the best in film for 2021, were announced on December 2, 2021. The gala was held on March 15, 2022, at Cipriani 42nd Street in New York City.

Top 10 Films
Films listed alphabetically except top, which is ranked as Best Film of the Year:

Licorice Pizza
 Belfast
 Don't Look Up
 Dune
 King Richard
 The Last Duel
 Nightmare Alley
 Red Rocket
 The Tragedy of Macbeth
 West Side Story

Top 5 Foreign Films
A Hero
 Benedetta
 Lamb
 Lingui, The Sacred Bonds
 Titane
 The Worst Person in the World

Top 5 Documentaries
Summer of Soul (...Or When the Revolution Could Not Be Televised)
 Ascension
 Attica
 Flee
 The Rescue
 Roadrunner: A Film About Anthony Bourdain

Top 10 Independent Films
 The Card Counter
 C'mon C'mon
 CODA
 The Green Knight
 Holler
 Jockey
 Old Henry
 Pig
 Shiva Baby
 The Souvenir Part II

Winners

Best Film:
 Licorice Pizza

Best Director:
 Paul Thomas Anderson – Licorice Pizza

Best Actor:
 Will Smith – King Richard

Best Actress:
 Rachel Zegler – West Side Story

Best Supporting Actor:
 Ciarán Hinds – Belfast

Best Supporting Actress:
 Aunjanue Ellis – King Richard

Best Original Screenplay:
 Asghar Farhadi – A Hero

Best Adapted Screenplay:
 Joel Coen – The Tragedy of Macbeth

Best Animated Feature:
 Encanto

Breakthrough Performance:
 Alana Haim and Cooper Hoffman – Licorice Pizza

Best Directorial Debut:
 Michael Sarnoski – Pig

Best Foreign Language Film:
 A Hero

Best Documentary:
 Summer of Soul (...Or When the Revolution Could Not Be Televised)

Best Ensemble:
 The Harder They Fall

Outstanding Achievement in Cinematography:
 Bruno Delbonnel – The Tragedy of Macbeth

NBR Freedom of Expression:
 Flee

References

External links
 

2021 film awards
2021 in American cinema
National Board of Review Awards